Fernando Baptista de Seixas Peyroteo de Vasconcelos (10 March 1918 – 28 November 1978) was a Portuguese footballer who played as a striker.

He spent his entire professional career with Sporting CP, scoring 544 goals in all competitions, winning 11 major titles and being crowned his country's top-division scorer on six occasions.

Club career
Born in Humpata, Huíla Province, Portuguese Angola, Peyroteo arrived at Sporting CP on 26 June 1937 after being introduced to the club by family friend Aníbal Paciência, and he quickly impressed new manager József Szabó by scoring a hat-trick in a practice match. His competitive debut came on 12 September, and he netted a brace against rivals S.L. Benfica. He went on to be part of the club's attacking line that included Albano, Jesus Correia, José Travassos and Manuel Vasques and was dubbed the Cinco Violinos (Five Violins), scoring 57 goals in only 30 games in his first year to win both the Lisbon Championship and the Taça de Portugal, then named Portuguese Championship.

During his spell with the Lisbon side, Peyroteo won five Primeira Liga trophies, five domestic cups and the first edition of the Supertaça Cândido de Oliveira at the new Estádio Nacional, scoring twice in the latter tournament for an eventual 3–2 extra time win over Benfica. He managed nine in a single game against Leça F.C. and eight against Boavista FC, and his goals-per-game ratio was the best in Portuguese football, at 1.68 successful strikes per game.

Peyroteo contributed 40 goals in the 1948–49 campaign as the Lions conquered their third league in a row. He retired shortly after at the age of 31, with the revenue from the testimonial match against Atlético Clube de Portugal being used to pay debts he had collected with a sportswear shop he had opened.

Peyroteo subsequently moved back to Angola, but returned eventually to Portugal to coach the national team: after his second game, a 4–2 loss at minnows Luxembourg for the 1962 FIFA World Cup qualifiers which brought young Eusébio his first cap, he was relieved of his duties, and quit football altogether. After a veterans match in Barcelona, he was forced to undergo surgery that brought complications later, leading to the amputation of one leg; he died in the Portuguese capital, at the age of 60.

International career
Peyroteo played 20 times for Portugal over nearly 11 years, scoring 14 goals. He made his debut on 24 April 1938, in an exhibition game with Germany in Frankfurt.

Personal life
José Couceiro, a football player and later a manager, was Peyroteo's grandnephew. António César de Vasconcelos Correia, 1st Viscount and 1st Count of Torres Novas and the 93rd Governor of Portuguese India, was his great-uncle; Augusto de Vasconcelos was his second cousin once removed.

Peyroteo's paternal grandfather was Spanish.

Career statistics

Club

International

Scores and results list Portugal's goal tally first, score column indicates score after each Peyroteo goal.

Honours
Sporting CP
Primeira Liga: 1940–41, 1943–44, 1946–47, 1947–48, 1948–49
Taça de Portugal: 1937–38, 1940–41, 1944–45, 1945–46, 1947–48
Supertaça Cândido de Oliveira: 1944

Individual
Bola de Prata: 1937–38, 1939–40, 1940–41, 1945–46, 1946–47, 1948–49

See also
List of men's footballers with 500 or more goals
List of one-club men

References

External links

1918 births
1978 deaths
People from Huíla Province
Angolan people of Portuguese descent
Portuguese people of Spanish descent
Portuguese sportspeople of Angolan descent
Portuguese footballers
Association football forwards
Primeira Liga players
Sporting CP footballers
Portugal international footballers
Portuguese football managers
Portugal national football team managers
Portuguese expatriates in Angola